The San Diego Underwater Photographic Society (SDUPS) is one of the earliest organizations ever to be dedicated to the promotion and advancement of the art and techniques of underwater photography and videography with nearly 50 years of history to its credit. SDUPS was first established on September 28, 1961 by underwater photographic pioneers Ron Church and Chuck Nicklin at San Diego’s Diving Locker dive shop formerly on Cass Street in Pacific Beach.

In 2005, SDUPS won first place in the Nature's Best Magazine annual  competition, one of the world's most respected photo competitions. The Societies winning photos were then displayed at the Smithsonian Museum.

SDUPS membership covers all levels of underwater photography from beginning U/W photographers to amateurs, semi-professional and full-time professional underwater photographers, using a wide range of equipment and techniques.  These include such varied techniques as film photography, Digital photography, High-definition video and even the 3-D underwater Imax technology of SDUPS members Howard and Michelle Hall (Under the Sea 3D, Coral Reef Adventure)

The Society is still active today with monthly meetings held every 4th Thursday of the month at the Scripps Institute of Oceanography's Sumner Auditorium at 8602 La Jolla Shores Drive, La Jolla 6:00 pm – 8:00 pm.  

Annually in May SDUPS presents its film festival featuring underwater photographs and video from all over the world by both professional and amateur photographers. 

SDUPS is a Corporation organized pursuant to the 501(c) Corporation laws of the State of California.

External links
The San Diego Underwater Photographic Society Official Web Site
Chuck Nicklin Bio
Chuck & Roz Nicklin's Dive Travel Site
SDUPS on Facebook
Ron Church Photography

Organizations based in San Diego